Heretaunga railway station is a suburban railway station serving Heretaunga in Upper Hutt, New Zealand. The station is served by Metlink's electric multiple unit trains of the "Matangi" FP class. Trains stopping at Heretaunga run to Wellington and Upper Hutt.

The station has an island platform between two tracks, linked by pedestrian overbridges to Bathurst Street and Maadi Place in the south, and pedestrian level crossings to Marion Street and Somme Road in the north.

History  
The station was opened in 1908.

From 1941 to 1954 the Trentham Army Camp had a set of railway sidings used for freight and for troop trains, with a shunting locomotive owned by the Army. Most of the track were removed in the 1970s. The siding was 0.63 km from Heretaunga railway station and 0.53 km from Trentham railway station.

References

External links
 Passenger service timetables from Metlink and Tranz Metro.

Rail transport in Wellington
Railway stations in New Zealand
Buildings and structures in Upper Hutt
Railway stations opened in 1908
1908 establishments in New Zealand